The Arlington Sprint Handicap is an American Thoroughbred horse race run annually during the second week of July at Arlington Park Racetrack in Arlington Heights, Illinois. A non-graded stakes open to horses age three and older, it is a sprint race contested on turf over a distance of  furlongs.

Part of the Breeders' Cup Challenge series, the winner of the 2009 Arlington Sprint automatically qualifies for the Breeders' Cup Turf Sprint.

Inaugurated in 1990 as the Arlington Sprint Championship, the name was changed to the Arlington Breeders' Cup Sprint for the 1996, 1997, 2000, 2001, and  2004 through 2006 editions. It was given its present name in 2007.

Since inception in 1990, the Arlington Sprint has been contested at various distances on both dirt and turf:
 7 furlongs on dirt : 1990
 6 furlongs on dirt : 1996–2007
 5.5 furlongs on turf : 2008–present

There was no race run from 1991–1995 and 1998–1999.

Records
Speed  record:
 1:01.89 – Mr. Nightlinger (2008) (at current distance of 5.5 furlongs)

Most wins:
 3 – Bet On Sunshine (1997, 2000, 2001)

Most wins by an owner:
 3 – David P. Holloway Racing (1997, 2000, 2001)

Most wins by a jockey:
 No jockey has won this race more than once.

Most wins by a trainer:
 3 – Paul J. McGee (1997, 2000, 2001)

Winners

 † There were Dead Heats in 1997 and again in 2007.

Notes

References
 2009 Arlington Sprint Handicap at the NTRA

Turf races in the United States
Horse races in Illinois
Open sprint category horse races
Listed stakes races in the United States
Arlington Park
1990 establishments in Illinois
Recurring sporting events established in 1990